Bairn is a Northern English, Scottish English and Scots term for a child.  It originated in Old English as "bearn", becoming restricted to Scotland and the North of England  c. 1700.
  The word was included in the English Dialect Dictionary with variant spellings barn, bayn, bayne that reflect varying pronunciations.

Compare with the Swedish, Norwegian, Icelandic, Faroese and Danish word for child "barn" or the West-Frisian "bern". Also the Latvian "bērns".

Cain bairns are children seized by witches and warlocks as tribute for the devil.

Examples of use
Examples of the term's use include the phrase "Jock Tamson's Bairns" as an idiomatic expression of egalitarian sentiment and the title of the 19th century Geordie folk song "Come Geordie ha'd the bairn." "Baloo Baleerie", a traditional Scottish lullaby, incorporates the term repeatedly, as does "The Great Silkie of Sule Skerry", a traditional folk song from Orkney.

References

Childhood
English dialect words
Scottish words and phrases